Momofuku may refer to:

 Momofuku Ando (1910–2007), Taiwanese-Japanese businessman who founded Nissin Food Products and invented instant noodles

Momofuku may also refer to the following, which are all named after Ando:
 Momofuku (album) by Elvis Costello
 By chef David Chang:
 Momofuku (restaurants)
 Momofuku (cookbook)

See also
 Momofuku Ando Instant Ramen Museum, an instant noodle museum